is a passenger railway station located in Minami-ku of the city of Okayama, Okayama Prefecture, Japan. It is operated by the West Japan Railway Company (JR West).

Lines

Station layout
The station consists of a two opposed ground-level side platforms, connected  by an elevated station building. The station has a Midori no Madoguchi staffed ticket office.

Platforms

History
Senoo Station was opened on 12 June 1910. With the privatization of Japanese National Railways (JNR) on 1 April 1987, the station came under the control of JR West.

Passenger statistics
In fiscal 2019, the station was used by an average of 3163 passengers daily

Surrounding area
Okayama Municipal Seno Hospital
Okayama Municipal Senoo Elementary School
Okayama Municipal Toka Elementary School

See also
List of railway stations in Japan

References

External links

 JR West Station Official Site

Railway stations in Okayama
Uno Line
Railway stations in Japan opened in 1910